Hadromys loujacobsi is an extinct species of rat, known only from three molars of early Pleistocene origin. They were found in the Upper Siwalik Group in the Punjab region of Pakistan.

References

Hadromys
Muridae
Mammals described in 1987